The Art of Self Defense is a cartoon made by the Walt Disney Company in 1941, featuring Goofy.

Plot
After a brief history on the many different forms of manly arts through the years, from early man bashing each other with their primitive weapons (and kicks), to Egyptians poking at their opponents' eyes, to the Medieval Era where knights in armor hammer each other with maces, to the romantic age where chivalrous gentlemen are slapping each other with the glove, and then to early fisticuff brawling (with the lack of proper science when men are fighting as long as 75 to 80 rounds), Goofy demonstrates the different methods of boxing.

The narrator shows the audience, with Goofy as the model, learn about proper breathing exercises, skipping rope for conditioning, as well as punching the bag to measure coordination, agility, and developing the skill of "covering up", and shadow boxing literally against his shadow, normally used for perfecting form and timing.

The shadow makes his appearance as the narrator explain about good sportsmanship when both fighters give a friendly handshake before they pit their skills. (The shadow gave Goofy a real vice-grip of a handshake.)

Then the narrator explains the use of common blows (or punches), such as the right cross, the left cross, and the "double cross".

With the motion of the slow-motion camera, Goofy is trying to deliver the uppercut against the shadow, much like a ballet dancer, but the opponent countered the blow and sends the Goof flying across the hall. Then the camera "rewinds" the scene, and resumes at normal speed, until the "frame" stops to where Goofy was almost hit by a real uppercut as the narrator explains how the course of the blow as the entire weight of the body is brought into play with terrific force and the action resumes. It's also important of not forgetting to duck (lower oneself against the blow).

The shadow demonstrates more of the miscellaneous punches such as the left-hand jab, bolo, rabbit, solar plexus, backhand, and the roundhouse punch.

Of course, there are rules involving fouls when the shadow hits Goofy below the belt, something that every fighter in boxing should never do, because it is very unsportsmanlike, unethical, unnecessary, and uncomfortable. (Goofy tries to protect himself by raising his pants and the beltline, but with little success as his opponent manages to find his way around the situation.)

And finally Goofy feels ready for the boxing ring as he faces off a different boxer as he charges at the opponent. But the foe, sporting a Navy anchor tattoo, knocks Goofy's lights out with a left haymaker.

Time ever marches on in the art of self-defense.

Production
The cartoon was one of the first to feature many replicas of Goofy at one time. The end of the short uses the Tarzan yell on the soundtrack.

Voice cast
 Goofy: George Johnson
 Narrator: John McLeish

Home media
The short was released on December 2, 2002, on Walt Disney Treasures: The Complete Goofy.

References

External links 
 

1941 films
1941 animated films
1940s sports films
1940s Disney animated short films
Goofy (Disney) short films
American boxing films
Films directed by Jack Kinney
Films produced by Walt Disney
Films scored by Leigh Harline
1940s English-language films